The Klamath County School District is a public school district serving Klamath County, Oregon, United States. Communities in the district include Bly, Bonanza, Chiloquin, Gilchrist, Keno, Klamath Falls, Malin, and Merrill.  As of June 2008, the school district had 6,657 students enrolled.  It is the state's largest school district geographically.

The board of trustees appoints a superintendent who is in charge of the day-to-day operations of the school district.  As of 2008, the superintendent is Glen Szymoniak.  A five-member elected board oversees district operations.

Demographics
In the 2009 school year, the district had 318 students classified as homeless by the Department of Education, or 5.2% of students in the district.

Schools 
The district has 13 elementary schools, a special education school, two middle schools, and six comprehensive high schools.

High schools
KCSD has six high schools:
Bonanza Jr./Sr. High School
Chiloquin High School
Gilchrist Junior/Senior High School
Henley High School
Lost River Jr./Sr. High School
Mazama High School

Middle schools
KCSD has two two-year middle schools: Brixner and Henley.

Elementary schools
KCSD has thirteen elementary schools: Bonanza, Chiloquin, Ferguson, Gearhart, Gilchrist, Henley, Keno, Malin, Merill, Peterson, Sage Community School, Shasta, Stearns.

See also
Klamath Falls City School District
List of school districts in Oregon

References

External links 
 Klamath County School District (official website)

School districts in Oregon
Klamath Falls, Oregon
Education in Klamath County, Oregon